John Dennis "Chick" Meehan (January 9, 1917 – April 9, 2004) was an American professional basketball player. He played for the Syracuse Nationals in the National Basketball League for two seasons and averaged 4.9 points per game. Meehan also played for a number of New York State Professional Basketball League and independent league teams.

References

External links
 Greater Syracuse Sports Hall of Fame biography

1917 births
2004 deaths
American men's basketball players
Basketball players from Syracuse, New York
Forwards (basketball)
Guards (basketball)
High school basketball coaches in New York (state)
Syracuse Nationals players